The Glen Campbell Collection was issued by Capitol Records (EMI Of Canada LTD) and sold exclusively through a special TV offer.

There is another compilation album titled Glen_Campbell_Collection released by EMI Gold in 2004 as a double album containing 34 tracks.

Track listing
Side 1:

 "Gentle on My Mind" (John Hartford)
 "By The Time I Get To Phoenix" (Jimmy Webb)
 "Wichita Lineman" (Jimmy Webb)
 "Galveston" (Jimmy Webb)
 "Try A Little Kindness" (Austin, Sapaugh)
 "Honey Come Back" (Jimmy Webb)
 "Rhinestone Cowboy" (Larry Weiss)
 "Southern Nights" (Allen Toussaint)
 "Help Me Make It Through the Night" (Kris Kristofferson)
 "The Straight Life" (Curtis)

Side 2:

 "Dreams of the Everyday Housewife" (Chris Gantry)
 "Where's The Playground Susie" (Jimmy Webb)
 "It's Only Make Believe" (Conway Twitty, Jack Nance)
 "Dream Baby (How Long Must I Dream)" (Cindy Walker)
 "Houston (I'm Comin' To See You)" (David Paich)
 "Country Boy (You Got Your Feet In LA)" (Dennis Lambert, Brian Potter)
 "Amazing Grace" (John Newton)
 "Someday Soon" (Tyson)
 "If You Could Read My Mind" (Gordon Lightfoot)
 "Less Of Me" (Glen Campbell)

1978 compilation albums
Glen Campbell compilation albums
Capitol Records compilation albums